Darbesar may refer to:
 Darbesar, Kermanshah
 Darbesar, West Azerbaijan